Christy Hui (許麗緹, born August 7, 1975) is a Chinese Film producer and director, that is mainly known as the creator of children's television shows such as Xiaolin Showdown and Xiaolin Chronicles, founder of ActionFliks Media Corp, and Chief Marketing Officer of Amprion Inc. Hui also is director, producer, and writer of her own film 9 Dragons Tea, and additionally helped in launching the first pan-Asian cable satellite channel, AXN. She has also worked for other renowned companies, including Sony Pictures and DirecTV.

Hui volunteers in Mentoring USA, and is an active participant of LA's BEST, which is an after-school program for LA's inner school kids.

Career

Christy Hui's most notable work, Xiaolin Showdown, ran between 2003 and 2006. It told the story of characters Kimiko Tohomiko, Raimundo Pedrosa, Clay Bailey, and Omi as they study to become Xiaolin monks, retrieve mystical artifacts known as Shen Gong Wu, and protect the world from 1,500 years of darkness by defeating villains known as the Heylin. The show was produced by Warner Brothers Entertainment and ran on Kids' WB  and Cartoon Network simultaneously. After a run of 52 episodes, Warner Brothers decided to end the series. Xiaolin Showdown was one of Kids' WB!'s best running television series, ranking among the top 10 overall programs for Saturday morning cartoons, coming in at No. 5 with boys 6-11, No. 4 with tweens 9-14 and No. 3 with male tweens 9-14. Among the broadcast competition, it also ranked No. 3 with boys 2-11, No. 4 with kids 2-11 and No. 6 among kids 6-11.

Following the end of Xiaolin Showdown, Hui claims to have taken a tour of the world to "reconnect". In 2008 she was inspired to create a project directed at young women titled Hulala Girls. A series about "Island Princesses and surfer besties who possess tropical powers! They surf the giant barrels, chase rainbows, and fly through the jungle, with animal pals in tow!" Some inspiration for this series was due to Xiaolin Showdown's popularity amongst young girls who had a strong demand for important female characters besides Kimiko, Wuya, and Katnappé. The initial idea was to create toys which would incorporate social media into the work similar to companies like Neopets or Webkinz, and that through success of the website, the characters' story would be picked up for a television series. The website had made ties with multiple ecological groups, including the Coral Reef Alliance and The American Forest. Unfortunately, the project did not take off, but fans can still purchase merchandise with the character designs on Hui's Redbubble, a portion of proceeds going to organizations such as Oceana, Ocean Defenders, and Save the Reefs.

In 2013, Hui was able to create a continuation to Xiaolin Showdown known as Xiaolin Chronicles. The series aired from August 2013 to May 2014 on Disney XD, and was later picked up to air the last 6 episodes on Netflix in July 2015. Due to the closing of Kids' WB! in 2008 and the network still owning copyright over many of its properties, production of the series was split between Canada and France. While the series is a part of the Xiaolin Showdown universe, Hui claims that the series is not a continuation, but a standalone series. According to a newsletter in July 2015, Hui hopes to produce a series meant to continue from where Showdown left off.

On November 11, 2015, Hui began a Kickstarter campaign to continue the Xiaolin franchise in the form of graphic novel Xiaolin Dragons. In the description, Hui described the planned series to go deeper into Xiaolin history, answering long time questions, and developing the universe further. However, due to terrorist attacks in Paris where the graphic novel would be produced, Hui postponed the campaign saying that it would return January 15, 2016. Since the cancellation of the campaign, a video posted to Hui's channel announced another project known as Xiaolin Theater in 2017.

After Xiaolin projects, in August 2017 Hui joined Amprion Inc. as Chief Marketing Officer. Amprion is a biotech company which specializes in biomarker testing for brain diseases including Alzheimer's, Lewy Body Dementia (LBD), and Parkinson's disease.

Despite this transition, Hui had not abandoned her creative endeavors. Her latest film as of 2021, 9 Dragons Tea, is a documentary about the absorbing history of tea. Hui serves as director, writer, and producer on this film, which took nearly 3 years to produce. Filmed on location in China's famous Wuyi Shan, Boston Tea Party Ship and Museum, and San Francisco, this 90-minute documentary unearths ancient secrets of tea that have never before been told.

References

External links

Living people
Chinese emigrants to the United States
Chinese animators
Chinese animated film producers
Chinese animated film directors
Chinese women animators
Chinese women film directors
Chinese women film producers
Chinese activists
Chinese women activists
1975 births